Khazami (also Romanized as Khazāmī) was a village in Kut-e Abdollah Rural District, in the Central District of Karun County, Khuzestan Province, Iran. At the 2006 census, its population was 7,833, in 1,543 families. On 23 January 2013, the village was merged with 8 other into one city called Kut-e Abdollah.

References 

Former populated places in Karun County